Magne Langerud (20 October 1942 – 25 September 1971) was a Norwegian politician for the Labour Party.

He served as a deputy representative to the Parliament of Norway from Akershus during the term 1965–1969. In total he met during six days of parliamentary session. He resided in Støren.

References

1942 births
1971 deaths
Deputy members of the Storting
Labour Party (Norway) politicians
Akershus politicians